Godshill is a village and civil parish on the Isle of Wight, England, with a population of 1,459 at the 2011 Census.  It lies between Newport and Ventnor in the southeast of the island.

History
Godshill is one of the ancient parishes that existed before the compilation of the Doomsday Book, the first recorded spelling being Godeshulle.

Ford Farm near Godshill was the site of the first Isle of Wight Festival in 1968, which attracted 10,000 people to see acts such as Jefferson Airplane and Arthur Brown.

Godshill Park House dates from about 1760 and was built as a home farm to serve the Appuldurcombe Estate. In around 1860 the house was extended, adding the Regency front, and became a private residence. It was used in the Second World War as an army hospital.

Today
Godshill is a much visited tourism destination on the Isle of Wight.  It is a quintessential English village with thatched cottages and the historic All Saints Church on the hill.  There are numerous tea rooms and gift shops.  There are two pubs: the "Griffin" – featuring a large griffin-shaped maze and children's playground – and "The Taverners".

Public transport is provided by Southern Vectis buses, routes 2 and 3.

Governance
Godshill is part of the electoral ward of Central Rural, previously Godshill and Wroxall. The population of the previous ward at the 2011 Census was 3,212.

Godshill Model Village
Since 1952, Godshill has been the home of a model village portraying itself and Shanklin's old village at a scale of 1:10. It is so detailed and on such a large scale that it contains a scale model of the model village. Within that second model there is a third, even smaller model of the village. The site is also an RHS Partner Garden showcasing around 2,000 conifers and shrubs.  Many are coarse bonsai-treated trees, to retain scale with the models.

All Saints' Church

The parish church is a medieval building noted for its medieval wall painting of a Lily crucifix, and a stained-glass window by William Morris.

References

External links

Godshill Parish and Parish Council
Godshill Model Village
Godshill Online

Villages on the Isle of Wight
Civil parishes in the Isle of Wight